Autrecourt or Autrécourt may refer to:

Autrecourt-et-Pourron, commune in the Ardennes department in northern France
Autrécourt-sur-Aire, commune in the Meuse department in the Lorraine region in north-eastern France
Nicholas of Autrecourt (1299–1369), French medieval philosopher and Scholastic theologian